This article lists the Communist Party of Great Britain's election results in UK parliamentary elections.

Summary of general election performance

Election results

By-elections, 1921–22

1922 general election

This list does not include Shapurji Saklatvala, a member of the party who was elected for the Labour Party, nor Joe Vaughan who also stood for the Labour Party.

1923 general election

This list does not include William Paul, Morgan Philips Price, Shapurji Saklatvala, Joe Vaughan or Ellen Wilkinson, party members who stood for the Labour Party.

1924 general election

By-elections, 1924–29

1929 general election

By-elections, 1929–31

1931 general election

By-elections, 1931–35

1935 general election

By-elections, 1935–45

1945 general election

By-elections, 1945–50

1950 general election

By-elections, 1950–51

1951 general election

By-elections, 1951–55

1955 general election

By-elections, 1955–59

1959 general election

By-elections, 1959–64

1964 general election

1966 general election

By-elections, 1966–70

1970 general election

By-elections, 1970–74

February 1974 general election

October 1974 general election

By-elections, 1974–79

1979 general election

By-elections, 1979–83

1983 general election

By-elections, 1983–87

1987 general election

By-elections, 1987–90

References

F. W. S. Craig, Chronology of British Parliamentary By-elections 1833–1987

Communist Party of Great Britain
Election results by party in the United Kingdom